Valentina Nikonova (born 5 March 1952) is a Soviet fencer. She won a gold medal in the women's team foil event at the 1976 Summer Olympics.

References

1952 births
Living people
Russian female foil fencers
Soviet female foil fencers
Olympic fencers of the Soviet Union
Fencers at the 1976 Summer Olympics
Olympic gold medalists for the Soviet Union
Olympic medalists in fencing
Sportspeople from Kazan
Medalists at the 1976 Summer Olympics
Universiade medalists in fencing
Universiade bronze medalists for the Soviet Union
Medalists at the 1973 Summer Universiade